Japanese singer-songwriter Ringo Sheena has produced many songs for other artists, as well as collaborating as a musical director for projects. The following is a list of songs that feature songwriting and/or song production by Ringo Sheena. In 2014, Sheena released an album compiling self-covers of several of these songs, called Gyakuyunyū: Kōwankyoku.

Songs produced for other artists

Music director

References

Production discography
Production discographies
Discographies of Japanese artists
Pop music discographies
Rock music discographies